Tchernetzov's Partisans was an independent Don Cossacks military force commissioned under the act of ataman Alexey Kaledin on November 7, 1917, in the opening stages of Russian Civil War. The 600-man regiment-size unit was formed of Don Cossack officers and students of Novocherkassk. However, many Bolsheviks considered Vasily Tchernetzov and his men brutal counter-revolutionaries, who were not entitled to protection when captured, as was the case with other prisoners of war. Colonel Tchernetzov's death at the hands of the Bolsheviks was explored in Mikhail Sholokhov's novel And Quiet Flows the Don.

After the death of Vasily Tchernetzov, surviving members joined the Volunteer Army's Ice March at the end of February 1918.

Commanders
 Colonel Vasily Tchernetzov

See also
 List of Don Army Units in the Civil War
 White movement
 Don Army
 Volunteer Army
 Russian Civil War

Notes

Military units and formations established in 1918
Military units and formations of the Russian Civil War
History of the Don Cossacks